WBXI-CD (channel 47) is a low-powered, Class A television station in Indianapolis, Indiana, United States, broadcasting programming from the digital multicast network Start TV. Owned and operated by the CBS News and Stations group, the station has a transmitter at the tower farm on the northwest side of Indianapolis.

History
The station first signed on the air in 1990 as W47AZ. Originally serving as an affiliate of the viewer-request music video network The Box, the station changed its call letters to WBXI-CA in 2001; that year, the station switched to MTV2 following that network's acquisition by Viacom, which acquired WBXI-CA. For a few months in 2004, channel 47 served as a repeater of then-sister station and UPN affiliate WNDY-TV (channel 23, now a MyNetworkTV affiliate); this ended when Viacom's Television Stations Group (now CBS Television Stations) subsidiary sold WNDY-TV to the LIN TV Corporation, owners of then-CBS (now CW) affiliate WISH-TV (channel 8), in February 2005.

Unexpectedly, Viacom retained ownership of WBXI-CA, before spinning it off to CBS Corporation in December of that year, following CBS' split from the former company; Viacom retained ownership of the MTV Networks; however, the station maintained its MTV2 affiliation.

In 2007, the station switched to MTV2's Spanish-language sister network MTV Tr3s. This would end in 2014 upon the expiration of its last carriage contract, when WBXI would switch to continuous weather information.

On January 1, 2018, WBXI began carrying programming from CBS/Weigel Broadcasting's Decades, with a local hour of the weather loop remaining weekdays at 7:00 a.m. On September 3, 2018, WBXI-CD launched CBS/Weigel's new network Start TV, dropping Decades. Decades shifted over to WSDI-LD2. The station transitioned to ViacomCBS ownership in December 2019.

Technical information

Analog-to-digital conversion
WBXI-CA maintained a construction permit to shut down its analog signal and flash cut its digital signal into operation on UHF channel 47 on September 1, 2015. The station turned on its digital signal on August 21, 2015, and ceased operations of its analog signal on September 1, 2015, the mandatory date for Class A Low Powered Stations to cease operations.

References

External links

Mass media in Indianapolis
CBS News and Stations
BXI-CD
Television channels and stations established in 1989
1989 establishments in Indiana
Start TV affiliates
Low-power television stations in the United States